"Wake Up Everybody" is a song by American R&B singer R. Kelly. was released on November 12, 2015 as a promotional single of his thirteenth studio album The Buffet.

Music video 
The official audio for the single was uploaded to VEVO November 13, 2015.

Track listing 
Download digital
Wake Up Everybody — 3:41

Charts

References

R. Kelly songs
2015 songs
2015 singles
RCA Records singles
Songs written by R. Kelly
Song recordings produced by R. Kelly